Glutaredoxin domain-containing cysteine-rich protein 1 is a protein that in humans is encoded by the GRXCR1 gene.

This gene is one of 60 loci associated with autosomal-recessive nonsyndromic hearing impairment. This gene encodes a protein which contains GRX-like domains; these domains play a role in the S-glutathionylation of proteins and may be involved in actin organization in hair cells.

Model organisms

Model organisms have been used in the study of GRXCR1 function. A mutant mouse line, called tasmanian devil (Grxcr1tde) was generated. Male and female animals underwent a standardized phenotypic screen to determine the effects of deletion. Twenty four tests were carried out on mutant mice and thirteen significant abnormalities were observed. Homozygous mutant animals of both sex displayed decreased body weights, grip strength, body fat, body length and plasma immunoglobulins, abnormal open field test and modified SHIRPA behaviour, and severe hearing impairment at 13 weeks. Male homozygous mutant animals additionally showed abnormal indirect calorimetry and clinical chemistry parameters,  improved glucose tolerance and a decreased leukocyte cell number. Female homozygotes also had an increased response to stress-induced hyperthermia and a significantly reduced monocyte percentage.

References
 

Genes mutated in mice